Ahmed Hulusi (born 1945 in Istanbul, Turkey) is an Islamic author from Turkey, whose works focus on philosophical and religious ideas.

Biography 
He was born on 21 January 1945 in Cerrahpaşa, Istanbul, and was named Ahmed, meaning ‘highly praised’, by his mother and Hulusi, meaning ‘sincere’, by his father. He spent the first 18 years of his life not following any particular religion, believing only in ‘a Creator’. Since every time he inquired about religion, he was told “do not question, just do as you are told”, he lived a seemingly ‘irreligious’ life. Three days after his father’s death, on 10 September 1963, unable to refuse his mother’s wish, he attended Friday prayer, where he felt an immense inspiration and desire to understand the reality of religion. That same day he decided to always maintain a state of ritual purity by performing ablution and committed to performing the prescribed daily prayers (salat).

He commenced his religious education by studying the eleven volumes of Sahih al-Bukhari and the whole of the Al-Kutub al-Sittah, two collections of Sunni hadiths published by the Turkish Directorate for Religious Affairs, and a translation of the Quran by Elmalılı, one of Turkey’s most eminent Quranic scholars. He then spent two years undertaking in depth studies of the modern sciences. This was then followed by an interval of intensive spiritual diets and retreats, leading him in 1965 to write his first book Revelations (Tecelliyat). This book is particularly significant for him, as it is an amalgamation of his unique ideas and theological viewpoints at the age of 21. Also in 1965, he journeyed alone to Mecca to fulfill his pilgrimage (hajj).

Continuing to integrate the information in the Quran with the contemporary sciences, Ahmed Hulusi bases his understanding of religion on the system and order denoted in the Quran by the One named Allah and has committed himself to “reading” reality as disclosed by Muhammad. Hulusi focuses on the underlying unity of everything and the oneness of existence, which he refers to as Allah. He stresses understanding the spirit of the Qur'an and the Sunnah rather than taking them out of context. He shares his findings through his writings, all of which are available for free on his website. Having studied preeminent collections of Islamic Law and evaluated the works of many renowned Sufi saints (wali) and scholars, he synthesizes his findings with scientific truths and presents them as an integrated system of rational reality.

In order to refrain from self-promotion, he has not put his surname on any of the books he has written over the last 40 years. He does not claim to be a guru or a teacher to anybody; on the contrary, he chooses to have very little contact with people, despite the large demand for and interest in his work. He was forced to put his photo on his books after a few impostors claiming to be Ahmed Hulusi started gathering and exploiting large crowds of people in Turkey.

He has never been a member of any political, social or religious organization, foundation or establishment. He has spent his life as a journalist researching Islamic mysticism, or Sufism, and the modern sciences.

Due to the 28 February 1997 ‘postmodern coup’ in Turkey, Ahmed Hulusi and his wife, Cemile, moved to London, where they lived for a year, before settling in the USA, where they reside today.

His Perspective of Islam

He considers his teachings a spiritual understanding of Islam in a modern context. Based on Muhammad's teachings and eminent Sufi authors like Abdul Karim Jili, Abdul-Qadir Gilani, Muhyiddin ibn-Arabi, Imami Ghazali, and İbrahim Hakkı Erzurumi, he denies the idea of a deity/god to worship, claiming there is no separate external god, there is only the One, referred to as Allah in the Qur'an. His principle has always been, “Do not be a blind follower of anyone. In the light of Muhammad’s teachings, choose and walk your own path in life independently.” He recommends that people re-evaluate the original teachings of Muhammad and the Quran in the light of science, without depending on any intermediary forces. Every individual has the right, indeed, is obliged, to directly interact with the teachings of the universal system through Muhammad and shape their lives accordingly.

Due to the nature of the universal system revealed to Muhammad, jobs and positions of a religious nature are illegitimate. The only person one must follow is Muhammad. Because of this, Ahmed Hulusi does not encourage anyone to become his ‘follower’. He prefers to live a relatively reclusive life in his small town and advises people to question his teachings and to do their own research. He says, “Don’t believe me; find and verify the truth for yourself.”

As long as they remain faithful to the original, all his works can be printed and distributed for free. All his works can be accessed and downloaded at www.ahmedhulusi.org

Publications

Books
 Decoding the Quran
 Prologue to Decoding Quran on the iBookstore
 The Essence of Man also available on the iBookstore  
 Muhammad's Allah also available on the iBookstore
 The Beautiful Names also available on the iBookstore
 The Observing One also available on the iBookstore
 Universal Mysteries also available on the iBookstore
 The Truth of Life also available on the iBookstore
 Know Yourself also available on the iBookstore
 Spirit Man Jinn also available on the iBookstore
 Revelations also available on the iBookstore
 The Power of prayer

Articles 
 Unity Versus Multiplicity
 Enjoy The Experience
 The Night of Power (Laylat al-Qadr)
 What is Dhikr
 Holographic Universe of Your Mind
 Does Creation Determine Knowledge?
 Universal Essence Our Essence
 Concept of Man
 Key to Knowing
 Quantum Leap
 Data Storage
 Observation of the Essence
 Reality or a Dream
 High Matter
 In Our Brain
 The Spirit of the System
 We are so Equal
 The Letter B
 Act on What You Believe
 The Truth about Islam
 Does the Divine Truth ever Worship?
 The Discretion of the One
 The Will of the One
 Mankind is Asleep
 The Divine Truth
 What is the Spirit
 The Human Spirit
 The Structure of the Jinns
 The Descent of Angels
 The Duties of the Angels
 The Relationship between the Brain and Spirituality
 The Antichrist
 Is it Angelic Inspiration or Satanic Temptation?
 Jinns Controlling Human Beings
 Dealing with Jinns and Witchcraft

Videos

See also 
 Ali Ünal
 Nurettin Uzunoğlu

External links
 / Ahmed Hulusi's website in English
 / scientific facts which support Ahmed Hulusi's books and thoughts video links
 Ahmed Hulusi's Twitter account

iTunes links
 Decoding the Quran app in Turkish
 Du'a and Dhikr app in Turkish
 The Beautiful Names / The Divine Names app in Turkish
 From Friend to Friend app in Turkish
 Quran recording in Arabic

Turkish writers
Turkish journalists
Turkish Sufis
Turkish Sunni Muslim scholars of Islam
Translators of the Quran into English
20th-century Muslim scholars of Islam
Living people
1945 births